WAAL (99.1 FM "The Whale") is a commercial radio station licensed to Binghamton, New York.  It airs a classic rock radio format and is owned by Townsquare Media.  WAAL is the oldest FM radio station in the Binghamton metropolitan area.  It is an affiliate of the New York Giants Radio Network.

The studios and offices are on Court Street in Binghamton.  The transmitter is off Ingraham Hill Road, also in Binghamton, amid other towers for local TV and FM stations.

History

WKOP-FM
In March 1954, the station signed on as WKOP-FM at 95.3 MHz.  It was the FM counterpart of AM 1360 WKOP (now WYOS).  The two stations simulcast and were network affiliates of the Mutual Broadcasting System.  They were owned by Binghamton Broadcasters, Inc.  At first, WKOP-FM broadcast at only 420 watts, a fraction of the station's current power.

In the 1960s, WKOP-FM received Federal Communications Commission (FCC) permission to move to 99.1 MHz, with an increase in power to 33,000 watts.  By 1970, it ended its simulcast with WKOP 1360 and began playing a progressive rock format.

WAAL
In 1974, the station was sold to Butternut Broadcasting, which switched the call sign to WAAL, running an AOR format.  The station was known as "WAAL (pronounced like whale) Stereo FM 99." The station dropped its AOR format in October 1985 for Top 40/CHR after the drop of CHR station WWWT-FM for adult contemporary due to the station's complaint on its listeners. In the late 1980s and early 1990s, it was known as "The Hot FM" and was affiliated with the ABC FM Network.

1996 brought an ownership change to Wicks Broadcasting, which changed WAAL's format to classic rock.

Citadel Ownership, then Townsquare
WAAL was acquired by Citadel Broadcasting in 1998 from Wicks Broadcast Group in a $77 million deal that included a total of 16 radio stations. Citadel merged with Cumulus Media on September 16, 2011.

In 2013, in a $281 million, multi-station deal involving Cumulus, Townsquare Media and Peak Broadcasting, 99.1 WAAL and AM 1360, now known as WYOS, were acquired by Townsquare.  The classic rock format has remained in place on WAAL.

On-air lineup
Free Beer & Hot Wings - 5am-10am, Monday - Saturday
Jen Austin - 10am-3pm, Monday - Saturday
Don Morgan- 3pm-7pm, Monday - Saturday
Ultimate Classic Rock with Uncle Joe Benson - 7pm-Midnight, Monday - Friday
R
On Air Alumni - The Oz, Pete Bucky, Big Wally, Barry Shapiro, Pete Kinney, Chris Gordon, "The Admiral" Keith Nelson, Glenn Corneliess, Roy Dackekrman, Dick Bascom, Rob Cain, Gerry Martire, Gregg Neavin, Roberta Haber, Thunder Reynolds, Rick Kelly, Doug Cortright, Steve Becker, Bill Davis, Ron Clay, Scott Michaels, Dave Freeman, Tony Russell, Bob Lindquist, Mr. Mandyke, Steve Willet, Dave Elias, Fred Horton, Julie Evans, The Wildman, The Banana Queen, John Carter, Doug Mosher, Captain, Doc Wells, Jim Free

Shows
 Free Beer & Hot Wings - from 5am-10am Monday - Saturday featuring Dumber Than The Show Trivia.
 99 Minute Classic Rock Ride -  with Jen Austin, weekdays beginning at 10 am.
 6 Pack Classic Rock Ride - Features at least six Classic Rock songs in a row every hour.
 The Southern Tier Closeup - Sundays at 7 am, hosted by Kathy Whyte, a radio program showcasing community issues.
 Encounter - Sundays at 7:15 am from the Broome County Council of Churches.
 Time Warp - Sundays at 8am, a syndicated 4-hour classic rock radio show hosted by Bill St. James.
 Ultimate Classic Rock - Monday through Sunday from 7 pm to Midnight with Uncle Joe Benson and Matt Wardlaw.

References

External links
99.1 The Whale - Official website
The Whale Morning Crew
The Rockin' 80's - Official website
Big Wally's MySpace

AAL
Classic rock radio stations in the United States
Townsquare Media radio stations